Bernhard Word Anderson (September 25, 1916 – December 26, 2007) was an American  United Methodist pastor and Old Testament scholar.

Information
Born in Dover, Missouri, Anderson earned degrees from the College of the Pacific and Pacific School of Religion. In 1939, he was ordained to the ministry of the (then) Methodist Church. He served Methodist churches in California, and later Congregational churches in both Connecticut and New York.

In 1945 he received the degree of Doctor of Philosophy at Yale, where he specialized in Old Testament studies. He received honorary degrees from the Pacific School of Religion, the University of the Pacific, and Colgate University.

He taught at Colgate University in New York, the University of North Carolina at Chapel Hill, the Colgate Rochester Divinity School, Drew University, (where he served as Dean of the Theological School for nine years), and finally as a Professor of Old Testament Theology at Princeton Theological Seminary, where he was Professor of Old Testament Theology Emeritus. In retirement, he continued to teach into the early 1990s at Boston University School of Theology.

He died on December 26, 2007, in Santa Cruz, California.

Selected works
 Contours of Old Testament Theology
 Understanding the Old Testament (1957)
 The Unfolding Drama of the Bible
 Creation Versus Chaos: The Reinterpretation of Mythical Symbolism in the Bible
 From Creation to New Creation
 Creation in the Old Testament (editor)
 The Eighth Century Prophets: Amos, Hosea, Isaiah, Micah
 Out of the Depths: The Psalms Speak for Us Today (Westminster Press, 1970)
 The Living World of the Old Testament (Prentice-Hall, 1957)
 The Place of the Book of Esther in the Christian Bible
 Faith Enacted as History: Essays in Biblical Theology author-Will Herberg (editor-B W Anderson) (Westminster Press, 1976)

References

Sources
 Obituary of Bernhard W. Anderson in SBL Forum.

1916 births
2007 deaths
American biblical scholars
20th-century Methodist ministers
Yale Divinity School alumni
Colgate University faculty
Drew University faculty
University of North Carolina at Chapel Hill faculty
Princeton Theological Seminary faculty
Colgate Rochester Crozer Divinity School alumni
American United Methodist clergy
20th-century American clergy